Shabab Al-Ordon Club (Women) is a Jordanian women's football from Amman representing Shabab Al-Ordon Club in the Jordan Women's Football League. The team was founded in 2003, and won the inaugural WAFF Women's Clubs Championship in 2019 with five wins in as many matches.

Results
Source:

Current squad

References

External links

Women's football clubs in Jordan
2003 establishments in Jordan
Association football clubs established in 2003
Sport in Amman